As developed by geolibertarian political economist Fred E. Foldvary, cellular democracy is a model of democracy based on multi-level bottom-up structures in either small neighborhood governmental districts or contractual communities.

Councils
In cellular democracy, a jurisdiction such as a county or city is divided into neighborhood districts with a population of about 500 people, with about 100 to 200 households. The voters in the district would elect a council. The small size of districts would allow for more informed voters at a smaller cost. Representatives, plus one alternate, would be elected to the council. This would be a "level-1 council".

A region containing 10 to 20 neighborhood districts would then vote for a "level-2 council". Each level-1 council elects a regular representative and an alternate to the level-2 council from its own regular membership.

A further region containing several level-2 councils would comprise a level-3 council, each level-2 council again electing a regular and an alternate representative to level 3. The level-2 representative sent up to the level-3 council would be replaced by his or her alternative.

The hierarchy would continue indefinitely, depending on the size of the state, or even expanding worldwide.

Secession
Councils could 'secede', creating a new branch of councils that would be incorporated back into the system.

Taxation
Each level 1 council would be able to select its source of revenue. Property taxes would be likely, and Foldvary favors the land value tax as the most efficient, just, and unintrusive option.  Every council above council-1 gets its money from the council below it.

See also

References

Foldvary, F. E.  (1997). "Democracy Needs Reforming". 
 Fred E. Foldvary. (1999). "Recalculating Consent.".
 
Fred E. Foldvary. (2008). Small-Group, Multi-Level Bottom-UP Democracy .
"Ward Republic"

Types of democracy
Georgism